is a World Cup alpine ski racer from Japan.

Yuasa made his World Cup debut in Shigakogen in 2003. He attained his first podium in World Cup in December 2012, a third place in slalom at Madonna di Campiglio, Italy. Yuasa represented Japan at the 2006 Winter Olympics, when he finished 7th in slalom.

World Cup podiums
 1 podium – (1 SL)

References

External links
 
 Naoki Yuasa World Cup standings at the International Ski Federation
 
 

Japanese male alpine skiers
1983 births
Living people
Olympic alpine skiers of Japan
Alpine skiers at the 2006 Winter Olympics
Alpine skiers at the 2014 Winter Olympics
Alpine skiers at the 2018 Winter Olympics
21st-century Japanese people